At the 1952 Summer Olympics in Helsinki, the men's individual modern pentathlon event was contested. It was the eighth appearance of the event, which had been featured at every Summer Olympics since 1912. The individual scores were also used for the men's team event.

Competition format
The modern pentathlon consisted of five events. The competition used a point-for-place system, with the lowest total across the five events winning.

 Riding: a show jumping competition. The course was 5000 m long, with a time limit of 10 minutes, 32 seconds. Riders started with 100 points and could lose points either through obstacle faults or going over the time limit. Negative scores were possible. Ties were broken by the specific time taken, with the quicker rider winning.
 Fencing: a round-robin, one-touch épée competition. Score was based on number of bouts won, with double-touches used as a tie-breaker.
 Shooting: a rapid fire pistol competition, with 20 shots (each scoring up to 10 points) per competitor.
 Swimming: a 300 m freestyle swimming competition.
 Running: a 4 km race.

Results

References

Modern pentathlon at the 1952 Summer Olympics